Carl R. Kositzky (April 7, 1876 – January 18, 1940) was a North Dakota public servant and politician with the Republican Party who served as the North Dakota State Auditor from 1917 to 1920. He was defeated in the 1920 Republican Primary and therefore did not run again for the office. He died at the age of 63 in Bismarck, North Dakota in 1940.

Notes

1876 births
1940 deaths
North Dakota State Auditors